The 1997 USA Outdoor Track and Field Championships was organised by USA Track & Field and held from June 20 to 24 at the IU Michael A. Carroll Track & Soccer Stadium in Indianapolis, Indiana. The four-day competition served as the national championships in track and field for the United States and also the trials for the 1997 World Championships in Athletics in Athens, Greece.

It was the third time that the stadium in Indianapolis had held the combined gender national track and field event.  The USA Junior Championships were held in conjunction with the event.

Athletes that finished in the top three of their event and held the IAAF qualifying standard were eligible to represent the United States at the 1997 World Championships. The United States was able to send three athletes per event to the competition, provided they all met the A qualification standard. In addition, this was the first year to also allow the reigning world champions an automatic qualification separate from the national selection.  That new rule was essentially created to allow Michael Johnson to qualify even though at the time of these championships he was unable to compete (and thus qualify) due to the injury he received in the Bailey–Johnson 150-metre race just two weeks earlier.  Johnson did recover in time for the World Championships and did successfully defend his world championship.  The World Championships national selection for the marathon and 50 kilometres walk were incorporated into the discrete national championship meets for those events. Selection for the relay races were made by committee.

Five Americans went on to win an individual gold medal at the 1997 World Championships;  Johnson, Maurice Greene, Allen Johnson, John Godina and Marion Jones.  In addition USA won the Women's 4 × 100 metres relay, and took silver in the 4 × 400 metres relay.  The Men's 4 × 400 metres relay crossed the finish line in first, but was disqualified in 2009 following the admission of long term doping by Antonio Pettigrew.

Results
Key:

Men track events

Men field events

Women track events

Women field events

World Championships qualification

Automatic byes
A total of eight American athletes received automatic byes into the 1997 World Championships in Athletics as a result of their being the defending champions from the 1995 World Championships in Athletics. Michael Johnson qualified in two events and his injury situation largely created the bye rule in the first place.  Johnson chose not to defend the 200 metres title, but was able to successfully defend his 400 metres title, a feat equalled by Allen Johnson and John Godina in their respective events.  Dan O'Brien also did not defend his title.

Michael Johnson Men's 200 metres
Michael Johnson Men's 400 metres
Allen Johnson: Men's 110 m hurdles
Derrick Adkins: Men's 400 m hurdles
Gwen Torrence Women's 100 metres
Gail Devers Women's 100 m hurdles
Kim Batten Women's 400 m hurdles
John Godina: Men's shot put
Dan O'Brien: Men's decathlon

Non-top three selections
Karl Paranya did not participate in the 1500m.  Pascal Dobert did not participate in the steeplechase.  Dan Middleman and 7th place Brad Barquist were the American representatives in the 10,000.  Since Allen Johnson and Bryan Bronson received a bye, 4th place Mark Crear and Octavius Terry were allowed to compete in their respective hurdle races.  LaMark Carter and no other American achieved the A standard in the triple jump.  Breaux Greer didn't achieve the A standard.  4th place, naturalized British Olympian Roald Bradstock did and took the third position at the World Championships.

References

Results

USA Outdoor Track and Field Championships
USA Outdoors
Track, Outdoor
Sports competitions in Indianapolis
USA Outdoor Track and Field Championships
Track and field in Indiana